Ophiogomphus rupinsulensis, the rusty snaketail, is a species of clubtail in the family of dragonflies known as Gomphidae. It is found in North America.

The IUCN conservation status of Ophiogomphus rupinsulensis is "LC", least concern, with no immediate threat to the species' survival. The population is stable.

References

Further reading

External links

 

Ophiogomphus
Articles created by Qbugbot
Insects described in 1862